WCEB (91.9 FM) was a radio station broadcasting a variety format. Licensed to Corning, New York, United States, the station was last owned by Corning Community College. Because of the location of its tower, the station was heard through much of the Corning, New York, area despite its low power.

History

The station began broadcasting a mix of news and rock music from a trailer on the Corning Community College campus on April 1, 1974, with an 18-hour broadcast day. It carried news broadcasts from the UPI Radio network on the hour, and local news on the half-hour. It was programmed and staffed completely by students, and was managed by sophomore student David Game, who was the station's first general manager. WCEB grew from the school's Radio Club, which had broadcast a closed-circuit signal to the student union for a number of years while exploring the feasibility of a broadcast station. Following Game's election as president of the Radio Club in 1973, funding was secured from the school, and Game supervised the project to obtain the necessary Federal Communications Commission license. He selected the station's call letters, which stood for "Corning Educational Broadcasting". The station's first broadcast was simulcast on local commercial station WCBA.

WCEB's license was cancelled June 2, 2022. It was one of several State University of New York-owned student radio stations whose licenses were allowed to lapse that day, without filing for renewal.

References

External links

CEB
Radio stations established in 1974
1974 establishments in New York (state)
Radio stations disestablished in 2022
2022 disestablishments in New York (state)
Defunct radio stations in the United States
CEB
CEB